Valentina Bergamaschi (born 22 January 1997) is an Italian professional footballer who plays for Serie A club AC Milan and the Italy women's national team. She mainly plays as a right-sided midfielder but can also play as a winger or a right-back.

She started her career in Switzerland, playing for Rapid Lugano, FF Lugano 1976 and FC Neunkirch, before returning to Italy to play for ACF Brescia Femminile. With Neunkirch she won the Nationalliga A championship and the Swiss Women's Cup, both in the 2016–2017 season.

A member of the senior Italy women's national football team since 2016, Bergamaschi also has third place medals from the 2014 UEFA Women's Under-17 Championship and the 2014 FIFA U-17 Women's World Cup.

Club career 
Bergamaschi, who was born in Varese but grew up and lived with her parents in Cittiglio, began competitive activity by joining FC Caravate, a club that promotes football in the homonymous Italian town, playing with boys from the age of nine years old.

In May 2011, Bergamaschi was called up to the representative under-15 team of Lombardy to participate in the Torneo delle Regioni (Tournament of the Regions) held in Chianciano Terme from 26 June to 3 July 2011. During the tournament, which the representative of Lombardy won by beating the Veneto in the final, Bergamaschi scored one of the goals and was noticed by the selectors of the Italy women's national under-17 football team, being called at the end of the tournament for a training camp with coaches Enrico Sbardella and Rita Guarino.

As a promising young player from Lombardy, Bergamaschi was contacted by a number of football clubs in higher divisions, but decided to sign for Alto Verbano, a club that was about to compete in the 2011–2012 Serie D Italian regional Championship, then at the lowly fifth level of Italian women's football. With Bergamaschi showing her qualities from the first match of the season Alto Verbano topped the league table, and retained their position until the end of the championship, gaining promotion to Serie C for 2012–2013.

During the 2014 summer transfer market, she joined Rapid Lugano of the Swiss Nationalliga B. Bergamaschi helped the club secure promotion to Nationalliga A at the end of the 2014–2015 season. Before the start of 2015–2016, the women's team left the men's club, becoming Lugano 1976. Bergamaschi decided to remain with the newly independent club for the following season. Ahead of the 2016–17 campaign, she transferred to FC Neunkirch.

She won a league and Swiss Women's Cup double in the 2016–2017 season with Neunkirch and also finished as top scorer in the league with 24 goals. But in June 2017, she became a free agent when Neunkirch withdrew from the Swiss championship and folded. In early July, she came back to Italy to join Brescia, gaining her first opportunity to play in Serie A.

In July 2018 she signed as a full-time contract with newly formed A.C. Milan Women, who had obtained Brescia's Serie A playing licence.

International career 
She was called into the senior national team for the 2016 International Women's Football Tournament of Manaus.

International goals

Honours 
FC Neunkirch
 Nationalliga A: Winner 2017
 Swiss Women's Cup: Winner 2017

Brescia Calcio Femminile
 Italian Women's Super Cup: Winner 2017

Statistics 
Here is list of teams and seasons in which Valentina Bergamaschi has played. It includes the total number of appearances (caps), substitution details, goals, yellow and red cards.

References

External links 

 

1997 births
Living people
Italian women's footballers
A.C.F. Brescia Calcio Femminile players
Swiss Women's Super League players
Sportspeople from Varese
Women's association football forwards
Serie A (women's football) players
FC Neunkirch players
A.C. Milan Women players
Italy women's international footballers
2019 FIFA Women's World Cup players
Footballers from Lombardy
FF Lugano 1976 players
Expatriate women's footballers in Switzerland
Italian expatriate sportspeople in Switzerland
UEFA Women's Euro 2022 players